Sang Yifei (born 18 February 1989 in Kaifeng) is a Chinese footballer who currently plays as a midfielder for Wuhan Three Towns.

Club career
Sang started his professional career with Chinese Super League side Beijing Guoan in 2007. In March 2011, Sang transferred to China League One side Wuhan Zall. In June 2012, he moved to China League One side Beijing BIT on a two-year loan deal.

On 27 February 2015, Sang moved to Chinese Super League side Tianjin Teda on a free transfer.  On 8 March 2015, Sang made his debut for Tianjin Teda in the 2015 Chinese Super League against Henan Jianye, coming on as a substitute for Guo Hao in the 72nd minute. He would not make any further first team appearances and was allowed to join another top tier club in Hebei China Fortune. Once again he struggled to establish himself and on 4 January 2017, Sang moved to fellow Super League side Liaoning Whowin. While this time he was able to break into the first team, unfortunately he would be part of the squad that was relegated at the end of the 2017 Chinese Super League season.  

Sang became free agent as Liaoning F.C. got disbanded in May 2020. On 8 August 2020, he signed with Wuhan Three Towns. In his first season with the club he would go on to aid them in winning the division title and promotion into the second tier. This would be followed by another division title win and promotion as the club entered the top tier for the first tine in their history. The following campaign he would be part of the squad that won the 2022 Chinese Super League title.

Career statistics 
Statistics accurate as of match played 11 January 2023.

Honours

Club
Wuhan Three Towns
Chinese Super League: 2022.
China League One: 2021
China League Two: 2020

References

External links
 

1989 births
Living people
Chinese footballers
People from Kaifeng
Footballers from Henan
Beijing Guoan F.C. players
Wuhan F.C. players
Tianjin Jinmen Tiger F.C. players
Hebei F.C. players
Liaoning F.C. players
Chinese Super League players
China League One players
Association football midfielders